Camilla Mingardi (born 19 October 1997) is an Italian volleyball player for the Italian national team.

Career 
She participated at the 2018 FIVB Volleyball Women's Nations League.

References

External links 
 FIVB profile
 http://www.legavolleyfemminile.it/?page_id=194&idat=MIN-CAM-97
 https://web.archive.org/web/20180916022751/http://www.volleybergamo.it/player/camilla-mingardi/
 https://www.oasport.it/2018/06/volley-femminile-giochi-del-mediterraneo-2018-le-convocate-dellitalia-azzurre-a-caccia-delloro-spiccano-mingardi-e-nicoletti/
 http://247.libero.it/focus/44693241/1/volley-a1-femminile-camilla-mingardi-una-nuova-giocatrice-della-zanetti-bergamo/
 http://www.tuttosport.com/news/pallavolo/femminile/pallavolo-femminile-a1/2018/06/26-44663409/volley_a1_femminile_camilla_mingardi_e_una_nuova_giocatrice_della_zanetti_bergamo/?cookieAccept

1997 births
Living people
Italian women's volleyball players
Competitors at the 2018 Mediterranean Games
Mediterranean Games competitors for Italy